The Brooke's duiker (Cephalophus brookei) is a species of antelope. It is distributed throughout Liberia, Sierra Leone and Côte d'Ivoire. It was elevated to species status.

References

Further reading
ultimateungulate.com

Brooke's duiker
Mammals of West Africa
Brooke's duiker
Brooke's duiker